Two Worlds is the second studio album and the full-length LP from German DJ André "ATB" Tanneberger.

Two Worlds is a 2CD concept album from ATB released 31 Oct 2000. CD1 is titled The World of Movement and CD2 is titled The Relaxing World. Two Worlds gave ATB the opportunity to work with several others artists including Heather Nova, York, Enigma and Roberta Carter Harrison of the Wild Strawberries. ATB is a big fan of Michael Cretu aka Enigma. Roberta and Ken Harrison are behind some of ATB's biggest hits and the collaboration between ATB and the Harrisons is the biggest in the ATB music archive.

As with Movin' Melodies, Two Worlds was released by Kontor Records (Germany) and Radikal Records (USA).  Edel Records (Club Tools) took on the release of Two Worlds.

Track listing

Charts

References

External links
 Two Worlds at The ATB Experience

ATB albums
2000 albums